Hlumelo Biko (born 19 January 1978) is a South African businessman and investment banker. He is the son of Steve Biko and Mamphela Ramphele.

Early life
His mother Ramphele was five months pregnant with him when she learned that Steve Biko, with whom she was having an affair, had been killed in police custody. She named him Hlumelo because it means "the shoot of a tree" in the Xhosa language.

Biko holds a B.A. in History and Politics from the University of Cape Town, and a master of Science in International Business Government Relationships degree from Georgetown University.

Career
Biko worked for the World Bank in Washington, D.C., in 1998 .

Biko and Ramphele co-founded Circle Capital, an investment company, in 2005. Biko was the CEO of Circle Capital. In 2008, Bespoke Magazine called him "the driving force behind a multi-million rand black empowerment company... one of South Africa's most intriguing empowerment vehicles." in a failed business venture where Biko was the Chairperson and a colleague and friend Clive Rugara, Circle line food group faced lawsuits from suppliers and former employees for non payment .  Financial challenges and “poor trading conditions ” forced Circle Food Group to close their doors.

Philanthropy
In parallel with a successful 13-year career as a venture capitalist, he is also a dedicated philanthropist, currently serving as vice-chairman of the Baxter Theatre, supporting budding small and medium enterprises as a board member of Endeavor offering mentorship and advice to a number of high impact South African entrepreneurs, and supporting increased access to education through institutions like Kommunity Group Projects, the University of Cape Town and African Schools for Excellence.

Private life
In early January 2018, he was arrested on charges of assault related to domestic violence of his wife. The charges were later dropped and the couple divorced.

References

External links
 A Conversation with Hlumelo Biko

1978 births
Living people
Biko family
Georgetown University alumni
People from Qonce
South African businesspeople
South African investment bankers
University of Cape Town alumni